Drombus is a genus of gobies native to fresh, brackish and marine waters of the Indian Ocean and the western Pacific Ocean.

Species
There are currently 10 recognized species in this genus:<ref name=Catalog>{{Cof record|genid=5302|title=Drombus|access-date=25 August 2018}}</ref>
 Drombus bontii (Bleeker, 1849) (Occasional-shrimp goby) 
 Drombus dentifer (Hora, 1923) (Yellow drombus)
 Drombus globiceps (Hora, 1923) (Kranji drombus)
 Drombus halei Whitley, 1935 (Hale's drombus)
 Drombus key (J. L. B. Smith, 1947) (Key goby)
 Drombus lepidothorax Whitley, 1945 (White-edge drombus)
 Drombus ocyurus (D. S. Jordan & Seale, 1907) (Bluemarked drombus)
 Drombus palackyi D. S. Jordan & Seale, 1905
 Drombus simulus (J. L. B. Smith, 1960) (Pinafore goby)
 Drombus triangularis (M. C. W. Weber, 1909) (Brown drombus)
 Drombus thackerae Carolin, Bajpai, Maurya & Schwarzhans, 2022 (otolith based fossil species)Drombus kranjiensis (originally described as Ctenogobius kranjiensis)  and Drombus whitleyi are now regarded as junior synonyms of Drombus globiceps and Bathygobius fuscus, respectively. Drombus clarki, Drombus irrasus, Drombus maculipinnis, Drombus plumatus, and Drombus tutuilae have been transferred to the genus Callogobius. D. bontii is treated as a synonym of Gobius bontii'' by FishBase.

References

 
Gobiidae
Taxa named by David Starr Jordan
Taxa named by Alvin Seale